Anomaloglossus surinamensis, the Suriname rocket frog, is a species of frog in the family Aromobatidae. It is endemic to Suriname and French Guiana where it can be found in leafy streams in montane forests across the region. It is a common frog and is thought to have wider distribution, but is fragmented in population due to its isolated habitat. It is tan in appearance, with brown stripes down each side of its body.

References

surinamensis
Amphibians of Suriname
Endemic fauna of Suriname
Taxonomy articles created by Polbot
Amphibians described in 2012